This is a list of rail accidents from 1920 to 1929.

1920
 March 9 – United Kingdom – A Lancashire and Yorkshire Railway freight train separates at Pendlebury, Lancashire. The rear portion runs away, pushing the banking locomotive downhill where it is derailed by catch points.
March 14 – United States – Bellows Falls, Vermont The crew of a southbound freight incorrectly reads the train order, confusing "Bartonsville" for "Bellows Falls". Instead of waiting at Bartonsville, they instead proceed south, and collide with a northbound passenger train at Williams River. At least six people are killed. 
 March – United States – Deerfield, Illinois. A locomotive boiler explodes killing one and injuring three.
 April 12 – United States – New York City: On the 6th Av. elevated line of the IRT company, one train takes a crossover into a track occupied by another knocking one car down to the street. One person is killed and 12 injured.
 April 24 - India - A collision on the Oudh and Rohilkhand Railway, east of Delhi, kills at least 150 as the wreckage is set alight by the gas installation aboard and burns fiercely. After the fire, pools of molten silver are found in the vicinity "resulting from the melting of the hoards of rupees many of the Indians carried."
 May 3 – France – A special Riviera Express running from Nice on the PLM railway during a partial strike derails at Les Laumes – Alesia station. Two people were killed: the regular driver and an engineering student who was learning the job to substitute for striking drivers.
 May 17 – British India – A passenger train starting from Bombay (now Mumbai) collides with a freight train, killing 23 and injuring 17, all in third class.
 May 20 – Spain – A freight train and a passenger train collide at Neon Daroston,  killing 40 people.
The fireman and engineer are killed and about 30 passengers injured. "All of the cars are reported to be on their sides in the water. A special train with doctors and nurses had been ordered from Seccorro [sic], and the wrecker ordered from Belen, which will also take all available doctors from there. The train left El Paso this morning."
 July 16 – Spain – A freight and passenger train collide between Barcelona and Tortosa, killing twenty people.
 October 7 – British India – During a labour dispute on the Madras Railway, the Madras-Bangalore Mail (which would now be Chennai-Bengaluru) derails due to a sabotaged track, killing 13 people and injuring 15; 60 coolies are arrested.
 October 8 – Italy – The Italian State Railways express to Milan is stopped by signals on the bridge from Venice to Mestre, but the signals behind are not set. A train from Trieste crashes into the rear killing 25 and injuring 20.
 October 9 – France – At Houilles in the Paris suburbs, unbraked cars separate from the rear of a freight train, roll downhill and derail, blocking the adjacent track with wreckage which was struck by a suburban train killing 47.
 October 27 – Romania – At Lufany,  an inexperienced railwayman's error cause two passenger trains to collide, killing about 50 and injuring 200 or more.
 October – Russia – At Pogranichny, the mail train from Vladivostok to Harbin, China wrecks killing about 100. 
 December 14 – British India – A mail train and goods train collide at Bommidi, killing 30 people and injuring 35.

1921 
  January 26 – United Kingdom – Abermule train collision: a head-on collision kills 17 people after improper, confused procedures resulted in the tablet from an incoming train being returned to its driver, who did not read it and assumed it was the following tablet that would give him permission to depart.
 January – Russia – On a mixed train from Novgorod, a consignment of flammable liquid  explodes at Luga,  killing 68 people. "Benzine Tank Explodes; 68 Persons Are Killed", Oklahoma City (OK) Times, January 18, 1921, p. 2
 February 13 – United States – More than 50 people were injured in Brooklyn, New York when two Long Island Rail Road trains collide after one train operator missed a stop signal.
 February 27 – United States – Porter, Indiana: Over 37 people were killed when the Canadian on the Michigan Central Railroad and the Interstate Express on the New York Central Railroad crash at a cross track. The Michigan Central train, bound for Toronto, Montreal, and Quebec City, overshot a block signal and was derailed by a derailed device.
 April 1 – United States – In Georgetown, Kentucky an unknown man was killed by a train. In June 2017 the John Doe was identified as Frank Haynes of Bronston, Kentucky
 June 25 – France – On a bridge over the Ancre River at Beaumont-Hamel,  on the Chemins de Fer du Nord, a derailment began with the luggage van at the rear of the train and spreads to the rear three passenger cars, which fall down an embankment; 25 people died and 60 were injured.
 June 25 – British India – Near Amroha on the Delhi-to-Moradabad line of the Oudh and Rohilkhand Railway, a  length of the line is breached by flooding within the space of an hour. The locomotive and two front cars of the next train fall into the water, killing 42 people.
 July 8 – United Kingdom – A 12-car Great Eastern Railway goods train without continuous brakes is running north on the East London Railway when a coupling breaks. Four goods wagons and the rear brake van separate from the train, and run back southward, downhill. Realizing this, the guard in the brake van applies brakes, but not in time. As the runaway cars approach Wapping station, they cross a track circuit boundary backwards, and the next northbound train receives a false clear signal. This is a New Cross to Shoreditch passenger train of the Metropolitan Railway. The resulting collision kills two railwaymen injures 16 people.
 July 25 – British India – A mail train from Rangoon (now Yangon) to Mandalay, both now in Myanmar, about  into its journey, collides at night with a goods train between Tawwi  and Pein Za Loke;   104 people are killed and 48 injured.
 August 8 – United Kingdom – At Selby railway station, a sidelong collision of two passenger trains caused by driver error; 17 injured.
 August 27 – Italy – On the Italian State Railways, a train from Ladispoli to Rome collides with a shunting locomotive; 29 are killed and over 100 injured.
 September 10 – France – On the PLM railway, the section from Bourg-en-Bresse to Lyon had not yet been reopened after one of two tracks was removed to repair World War I damage elsewhere. Consequently a train from Strasbourg to Lyon uses a side track at Les Échets, but runs too fast over the switch and derails killing 38.
 September 18 – Norway – Nidareid train disaster in Trondheim. Confusion and unfortunate circumstances lead to a head-on collision between two passenger trains killing six.

 October 5 – France – Two passenger trains collide due to a signalman's error in the Batignolles Tunnel, Paris; at least 28 people were killed in the ensuing fire.
 November 19 – British India – 64 Mappila prisoners die of asphyxiation while being transported on a prison car with its ventilation blocked by paint,
 December 5 – United States – Bryn Athyn Train Wreck in Woodmont, Pennsylvania: Two local passenger trains on the Philadelphia and Reading Railway collide and catch fire, killing 27 people after signals were ignored.

1922 
 March 23 – United States – Azusa, California: A passenger train derails after hitting one of the city's steamrollers. The engineer and fireman are killed while the steamroller driver jumps to save his own life.

 May 1 – United States – Alton, Illinois, a Chicago and Alton Railroad passenger train strikes a fire engine on its way to a fire, at a grade crossing at 9th and Piasa Streets. The driver and officer on the fire engine seat are injured while two other firefighters jump off. The fire engine, only a year old, was squeezed between the moving passenger train and a parked coal car, and was beyond repair. The broken pieces of the fire engine had to be hauled away in a truck, and a new fire engine had to be purchased to replace it.
 June 27 – Germany – Berlin: Following a huge demonstration in the Lustgarten against the assassins of Walter Rathenau, the suburban trains are so overwhelmed with passengers that some people ride outside on the running boards, and dozens of them on one train are struck when a door on another train swings open between stations. Casualties were reported as 29 killed and 60 injured and 15 killed and over 100 injured.
 July 11 – Spain – Paredes de Nava: A head-on collision between the Asturias Mail and an express from Galicia kills 32, including both engine crews, and seriously injures 19.
 July 31 - United States - Laurel, Maryland: Two freight trains collide; one engineer slightly injured.
 August 1 – France – Miélan: Two trains carrying pilgrims from Moulins to Lourdes collide when the first one stalls climbing a hill and then runs backwards, apparently due to a brake system failure. Forty people are killed.
 August 5 – United States – Missouri Pacific Railroad train 32, a local passenger train northbound from Hoxie, Arkansas, to St. Louis, was told at Riverside to proceed  to Wickes, Missouri and take the siding while northbound express train 4 (from Texas to St. Louis) and southbound express 1 (the Sunshine Special from St. Louis to Texas) go past. Halfway there, it stopped for water at Sulphur Springs, Missouri. Train 4, while in motion, received an order to stop at Cliff Cave (after Wickes) to let southbound train 1 past. While reading the order, the engineer missed seeing the block signal at Sulphur Springs and crashed into train 32 killing 34 and injuring about 170 injured, mostly in the local, in the worst rail accident ever in Missouri.
August 21 – United Kingdom – A South Eastern and Chatham Railway passenger train leaves , Kent against signals and collides with another train killing three.
Three day coaches and smokers were turned over on their sides while the engine and baggage car remained on the rails.
December 13 – United States – Humble, Texas: Traveling at moderate speed, Houston East & West Texas Railway passenger train No. 28, bound for Shreveport, sideswipes a light engine at Humble Station breaking off the boiler check valve on the engine; twenty-two are killed and 11 injured when high-pressure steam enters the first three passenger coaches. The cause is attributed to watchman error.

1923
 January 14 – British Ceylon (now Sri Lanka) – Anuradhapura: The Jaffa Mail wrecks at a washout during severe storms; the locomotive, tender, brake van, travelling post office, and one passenger car fall into the floodwaters, killing 39 people.
 February 18 – France – A train from Paris to Strasbourg on the Chemins de fer de l'Est collides with a freight train, killing 27 people.
 March 30 – United States – Columbus, Ohio, A westbound Big Four Flyer en route from Boston to Cincinnati hits an automobile at a grade crossing killing the 3 occupants of the car, the engineer, the fireman, and an editor for the Warren Democrat; another 14 were injured.
 April 15 – United Kingdom – A Great Western Railway freight train collides head-on with a passenger train at Curry Rivel, Somerset due to a signalman's error injuring nine.
 July 2 – Romania – At Vinty-Leanca,  between Ploești and Bezeu (now Ploiești and Buzău), a shunter's error diverts a mail train from Bucharest to Jassy into a siding where it crashes into a stationary goods train killing 63 people and injuring 100 injured.
 July 3 – United States – A passenger train in New Mexico derails killing both of the engineers and both of the firemen, and injuring 45.
 July 6 – New Zealand – Ongarue railway disaster: A southbound express runs into a mudslide killing 17. A railway worker in charge of a gang also dies at the scene of cerebral haemorrhage – verified from news reports of the day.
 July 31 – Germany – A night express from Hamburg is run in two sections due to a heavy passenger load. At Kreiensen, between Hildesheim and Göttingen,  the advance section stops due to engine trouble, and the driver of the following section missed seeing a signal because of something in his eye and crashes into the rear of the leading section. The resulting crash and fire kills 47 people.
 August 13 – United States – Colorado and Southern Railway train 609 collides head-on with Santa Fe train 6 in Fowler, Colorado, killing 5 people and injuring at least 5.

 September 1 – Japan – Nebukawa Station accident: A landslide caused by the 1923 Great Kantō earthquake hits Nebukawa Station and an approaching train. 112 passengers were killed and thirteen injured.
 September 8 – USSR – An express train derails at Omsk killing 82 and injuring 150.
 September 27 – United States – Glenrock train wreck: A Chicago, Burlington and Quincy Railroad passenger train falls through a bridge washaway at Cole Creek, killing 30 of the train's 66 passengers. This was the worst railroad accident in Wyoming's history.
 October 27 – Canada – Canadian Pacific Railway train 4, seven colonist passenger cars derail near Savanne, Ontario as a result of a broken rail.
 December 23 – United Kingdom – A London and North Eastern Railway express passenger train overruns signals at Belford, Northumberland and collides with a locomotive.

1924 
 March 14 – India – Near Bareilly, on the Oudh and Rohilkhand Railway, a tropical cyclone blew five cars of a train off a bridge leaving two submerged in a river. One early report said 18 bodies were found before the submerged cars were searched; another report estimated forty to fifty total dead.
 April 23 – Switzerland – Two passenger trains collided head-on at  due to a pointsman's error and the driver of one of the trains passing a danger signal. A lack of interlocking was a major contributory factor. Fifteen people were killed.
 April 26 – United Kingdom – A London, Midland and Scottish Railway electric multiple unit overruns signals and crashes into the rear of an excursion train at  station, London.
 May 2 – USSR – On its inaugural run, the Lenin Express from Odessa to Moscow derails, possibly due to sabotage, and several cars fell down an embankment. Many people were killed and injured but nothing was reported in the Soviet papers.
 July 28 – United Kingdom – A passenger train overruns signals and collides with another at  station, Edinburgh, Lothian killing five.
 August 19 – French West Africa – Due to a flood, the Paporah Bridge  on the Dakar–Niger Railway  collapses with a train on it, killing 29 people.
 August 19 – British India – At Montgomery (now Sahiwal, Pakistan) on the North Western State Railway, two trains collide, killing 107 people and injuring 104; the assistant stationmaster of an adjacent station was arrested for criminal negligence.
 October – USSR – On the line from Moscow to Ivanovo and Vasenensk,  a mixed train carrying passengers and gasoline is destroyed by fire. It was said that of 200 people on board only 27 survived, but the Soviet authorities suppressed the story.
 November 3 – United Kingdom – Lytham rail crash: The lead tyre of a locomotive suddenly fractures causing the train to derail and strike a bridge and a signal box killing fourteen.

1925 
 January 13 – Germany – An express train from Berlin to Cologne suddenly encounters fog and the driver passes signals without realizing it. The train crashes into the rear of a Ruhr local standing at Herne, smashing through the fourth-class cars at the rear; 32 people were killed and 57 injured, all on the local.
 January 13 – Germany – On the same day (and in fact at almost the same time) as the Herne disaster, a similar collision occurs at Hattingen in the Ruhr killing three and injuring twelve.
 January 30 – Ireland – Owencarrow Viaduct disaster: - A train is blown off a viaduct in Donegal in winds approaching  killing four.
 February 27 - Canada - A Canadian Pacific Railway passenger train collides with a train operating a snowplow near Lachute, Quebec. Three crew members on the snowplow train were killed.
 April 9 –  Spain – On the line from Barcelona to Tarrasa, two trains collide on a sharp curve near a tunnel at Las Planas crushing several cars against the wall which killed 25 and seriously injured 46.
 May 1 – Poland – A German express train from Königsberg (now Kaliningrad, Russia) to Berlin crossing the Polish Corridor derails on a sharp curve between Swarożyn (Swaroschin) and Starogard Gdański (Preußisch Stargard), sending the locomotive and six cars  down an embankment; 26 people are killed and 12 seriously injured, mostly in first class, and because the train doors were locked while in Poland, passengers remain locked into the undamaged cars for another two hours. Germany accused Poland of poor maintenance while Poland blamed Germany of sabotaging their own train to discredit Poland.
 June 9 – Australia – near Traveston, South East Queensland. The Rockhampton Mail train derails on a high timber trestle bridge, killing ten people and injured 48 when a passenger car and the luggage van plunged off the bridge, and another passenger car was pulled on its side. It resulted in baggage cars being specially built for passenger trains and ended, for a time, the use of goods vehicles on passenger trains.
 June 16 – United States – Rockport train wreck: A special seven-car Delaware, Lackawanna and Western Railroad passenger train from Chicago to Hoboken, New Jersey encounters road debris that had been washed onto a grade crossing by a torrential rainstorm. The train derails, and two cars land adjacent to the locomotive, with escaping steam scalding numerous passengers; 51 were killed. The passengers were German-Americans traveling to Bremen, Germany, via the [[USS Republic (AP-33)|SS Republic]].
 June 18 – United Kingdom – A Metropolitan Railway electric locomotive collides with carriages at Baker Street, London injuring six people.
 August 20 – United States – Two passenger trains collide head-on on the Denver & Rio Grande Western Railroad near Granite, Colorado killing two and injuring 117. The cause was determined to be human error and a blistering report followed: "It would be difficult to imagine a more inherently dangerous system, or lack of system, for the operation of trains...".
 August 22 – Isle of Man – A train hauled by No.3 Pender runs into  station with insufficient braking power as the brakeman was left behind at  killing the driver. Vacuum brakes were introduced on the Isle of Man Railway as a result of the accident.
Rescue efforts resulted in further collapse and the tunnel was sealed with the train and unrecovered victims entombed within.

 1926 
 March 14 – Costa Rica – El Virilla train accident: A train fell off a bridge over the Río Virilla between Heredia and Tibás, resulting in 248 deaths and 93 wounded.
 May 24 – Germany – A train crashes into the rear of an excursion train standing at the platform at Munich East station killing 33 people and injuring about 100. The driver of the second train was convicted and sentenced to five months in prison.
 May 26 – Australia – Caulfield, Victoria: Caulfield railway accident, a night-time collision of a six-car electric multiple unit with another six-car electric multiple unit at Caulfield Railway Station resulted in three deaths and numerous injuries.
 June 7 – Spain – Barcelona: The famous architect Antoni Gaudí was run over by a tram and died a few days later.
 June 9 – South Africa – At Salt River, near Cape Town, a train derails due to a coupling lodged in the track. The rear cars broke away and two of them hit an overbridge killing 17 people and injuring about 40 or 50.
 July 3 – France – At Achères-la-Forêt on the Chemins de fer de l'Est, a train from Le Havre to Paris takes a turnout due to urgent repairs to the main line. The driver misses the  speed restriction and derails killing 20, including the himself, and injuring 98.
 August 7 – United Kingdom – On an LNER 6-car electric multiple unit train completing a loop service from Newcastle via Monkseaton, after leaving Heaton station the driver ties down the control and dead man's handle with two handkerchiefs, leaves his driving position, leans out of the cab window to look backwards, strikes a bridge support, and is dragged out of the train and killed. Realizing the train was overshooting Manors station, the guard applies brakes, but too late to prevent a  collision with a freight train. The front cars were lightly loaded, but 16 passengers were injured, including a young "courting couple" in the frontmost compartment—whom the driver was presumably trying to watch, but the official report declined to speculate.
 August 13 – United States – Calverton, New York – Long Island Rail Road's Shelter Island Express train jumps the tracks and crashes into the Golden's Pickle Works factory, resulting in six deaths.
 August 19 – Germany – A Berlin-to-Cologne express derails on an embankment due to sabotage of the track. The locomotive and seven cars fall down the embankment and two cars are telescoped; 21 people died. Two men were convicted and sentenced to death.
 August 30 – United Kingdom – A passenger train collides with a charabanc on a level crossing at Naworth, Cumberland due to errors by the crossing keeper and a lack of interlocking between signals and the gates, killing nine.
 September 1 – Spain – The Barcelona-to-Valencia mail train runs into a landslide and derails between L'Ametlla de Mar and L'Ampolla killing 25 and injuring 50.
 September 5 – United States – Granite, Colorado – Denver & Rio Grande Western Railroad's Scenic Limited running southeast, exceeds the rated speed for the track and crashes into the Arkansas River, resulting in 30 deaths and 54 injuries. The locomotive, tender, and six cars plunged into the river. Crash reports indicate the engineer was attempting to make up time since the train was running 25 minutes late.
 September 13 – Australia – Murulla railway accident: Goods wagons on a siding uncouple, roll down a slope and crash into an oncoming mail train, resulting in 27 deaths and 37 injuries. It would remain the worst train crash in New South Wales history for just under 51 years until the Granville rail disaster of 1977 which left 84 people dead in Australia's worst rail disaster.
 September 23 – Japan – A Tokyo-Shimonoseki limited express derails at Hataga river bridge in eastern Hiroshima, in an incident caused by heavy rain and flooding, killing 34 and injuring 39.
 November 5 – United Kingdom – A milk train divides near , Hampshire. Because the guard fails to protect the train, a passenger train runs into it. One person was killed.
Further wagons derail and partially collapse a signal post. A passing express passenger train collides with the signal post, ripping out the side of the carriages. Eleven people were killed.
November 24 – United Kingdom – A London, Midland and Scottish Railway passenger train overruns signals at Upney, Essex and rear-ends another passenger train injuring 604 people.
 December 8 – China – A passenger and freight train collide at Machungho  on the South Manchuria Railway, killing 25 and seriously injuring 54.
 December 11 – China – A passenger and freight train collide on the South Manchuria Railway, killing 25 and seriously injuring 54, this time at Tieling.
December 23 – United States – Rockmart, Georgia. The Northbound Ponce de Leon crashes head-on into the Southbound Royal Palm, resulting in 19 deaths and 115 injuries. It was remembered later on as the world-famous folk song, "Wreck of the Royal Palm" by Vernon Dalhart.
December 28 – United Kingdom – Elliot Junction rail accident: On the joint line of the North British and Caledonian Railways, a major snowstorm led to many delays, the derailment of a freight train, and a collapse of telegraph lines that left the block signalling inoperative. Rather than staff being called out to assist trains with hand signals and detonators, drivers were told to proceed with caution.

 1927 
 February 13 – United Kingdom – Hull Paragon rail accident: One signalman operated his lever too early, defeating the interlocking mechanism, just as another signalman operated the wrong lever. The resulting head-on collision killed twelve.
 February 27 – United Kingdom – An express passenger train collides with a light engine near Penistone, Derbyshire due to an error by the driver of the light engine.
 May 15 – Canada  – Three trainmen were killed and many passengers injured when the Canadian Pacific Railway eastbound express train runs into a rockslide and derails near Nipigon, Ontario.
 July 6 – Argentina – A trainload of Chilean army cadets were traveling from their school in Santiago, Chile to attend the dedication of a monument in Buenos Aires. At Alpatacal in Mendoza Province, the special was signaled with detonators to stop and wait for the Internacional coming from Buenos Aires. The train fails to stop and hits the other train, killing thirty and injuring hundreds.
 July 27 – South Africa – Heidelberg: On a single-track line, the driver of a southbound goods train from Roodekop (near Johannesburg) apparently forgets that the staff he is carrying only allows him to proceed as far as a newly added side track, where he is to wait for a northbound train from Durban.  Altogether 29 people were killed, some of them by exposure to the winter weather while waiting for rescue, and 54 injured.
The locomotive is repaired and returned to service on 23 August, but is involved in another accident the next day.
 August 24 – United Kingdom – Sevenoaks railway accident: Water in the tanks of a locomotive on the Southern Railway sloshes violently and derails the train, killing 13.
 August 25 – France – On the Chemin de fer du Montenvers,  the rack railway from Chamonix-Mont-Blanc to the Hotel de Montenvers by the Mer de Glace glacier, a train runs away downhill due to operating errors by the crew. The first car derails, breaks away, and falls  into a ravine, killing 16 to 20 people.
 October 2 - United States - Nine are injured when three coaches of the Peoria Limited of the Illinois Traction System derail on a curve at Edwardsville, Illinois, and crash into the porch of the Vanze Hotel. Two passengers are taken to St. Elizabeth’s Hospital at Venice, Illinois, while others are given treatment at the hotel. Motorman W. M. Nave, who was bruised, stated that the brakes failed to function as the trainset approached the curve near the hotel.
 October 26 - Yugoslavia - The Vienna correspondent of the Exchange Telegraph stated “that 260 persons are reported to have been killed when a passenger train plunged over a precipice between Sarajevo and Mostar.” 
 December 3 – Canada  – An eastbound Canadian Pacific Railway passenger train collides with the derailed cars of a westbound Canadian National Railways freight train on the CNR's double-track line near Port Credit (now part of Mississauga, Ontario).

 1928 
 January 22 – British India – Between Hayaghat (now in Darbhanga District, Bihar) and Kishanpur (now in Samastipur District, Bihar), a locomotive breaks away from the train behind it, which then crashes hard into it; two cars derail and fall down an embankment. At least thirty people died.
 January 28 – British India – A mail train from Mandalay to Rangoon (now Yangon), both now in Myanmar, is derailed by sabotage to the track at a bridge between Yindsikkon (now Yin Taik Kone) and Kyauktaga. Dacoits were suspected of the crime and an Indian man was sentenced to death, but his conviction was quashed.
 March 12 – British Ceylon (now Sri Lanka) – Kalutara: An express from Galle to Colombo crashes head-on at speed into an ordinary passenger train, killing 25 or 28 people and injuring 41. Several railwaymen are found responsible.
 June 4 – China,Feng-tien,Mukden – Huanggutun incident.
 June 10 – Germany – The locomotive and four cars of the Munich to Frankfurt fall down an embankment after derailing at Veitsbronn killing 22.
 June 27 – United Kingdom – Darlington rail crash, head-on collision kills 25.
 July 9 – United Kingdom – B2X class locomotive No. B210 sideswipes an electric multiple unit at  when the driver misreads signals. Two people are killed and nine injured, six seriously.
 August 17 – United Kingdom – A London and North Eastern Railway express passenger train hits a lorry on a level crossing near , Cambridgeshire and derails.
 August 24 – United States – 1928 Times Square derailment: The last two cars of a downtown express train on the IRT Broadway–Seventh Avenue Line of the New York City subway derail at a switch, killing 18 people and injuring about 100.
 September 10 – Czechoslovakia – Between Zaječí and Břeclav, both now in Czechia, an express passenger train from Paris to Bucharest collided with a freight train, killing 21 people and injuring at least 29.
 October 13 – United Kingdom – Charfield railway disaster: A Leeds-to-Bristol night mail train failed to stop at signals and collided with a freight train being moved into a siding. The mail train derailed and then collided with another freight train on the main line. Gas lighting on the passenger coaches of the mail train caused an intense fire, destroying four coaches. An estimated 16 died, and 41 were injured according to official report.
 October 25 United Kingdom – A London, Midland and Scottish Railway express passenger train rear-ends a freight train near , Dumfriesshire due to a signalman's error. Four people are killed and five injured.
 October 26 – Romania – At Reșca, a fast train to Bucharest is incorrectly diverted onto a track occupied by the Simplon Orient Express. Two cars of the diverted train telescope and almost everyone in them is killed; 34 were killed altogether. In the aftermath there were complaints that the station staff were so unhelpful that the passengers had to telegraph for rescue. Several railwaymen are punished by firing or suspension.

1929
 January 17 – United States – near Aberdeen, Maryland: A Pennsylvania Railroad train bound for Baltimore rear-ends a freight, then a third train hits the derailed freight killing five and injuring 38. An unlit semaphore stop signal was invisible in heavy fog. Bandleader Fletcher Henderson, traveling with several of his musicians, was among the injured but still conducted an engagement in Baltimore that night.
Many people were injured.
 June 9 – United Kingdom – A London and North Eastern Railway steam railcar 220 Waterwitch overruns signals at Marshgate Junction, Yorkshire and stops on the main line where it is struck by an express passenger train.
 August 7 - Canada - An automobile driver caused the derailment of a Canadian Pacific Railway train near Tweed, Ontario which killed one of the crew.
This led to the introduction of the La, the German railways' book of temporary speed restrictions on the network and the distant signals indicating to expect the home signal showing to slow down if necessary.
 September 23 – USSR – A train from Moscow (now in Russia) to Siberia derails at Zuevka,  between Kursk (now in Russia) and Kharkiv (now in Ukraine); at least 30 were killed.
An express passenger train ran into it.
 November 20 – United Kingdom'' – Bath Green Park runaway: A freight train runs away and crashed in  goods yard, killing the driver and two railway employees in the yard, and severely injuring the fireman. The runaway was caused by the crew being overcome by fumes while travelling through Combe Down Tunnel.

See also 
 List of London Underground accidents

References

Sources

External links
 Railroad train wrecks 1907–2007

Rail accidents 1900andndash;1949
20th-century railway accidents